Maria Maricich (born March 30, 1961, in Sun Valley, Idaho) is a retired American alpine skier who competed in the women's downhill at the 1984 Winter Olympics, finishing 19th.

External links
 sports-reference.com
 

1961 births
Living people
American female alpine skiers
Olympic alpine skiers of the United States
Alpine skiers at the 1984 Winter Olympics
People from Sun Valley, Idaho
21st-century American women